Adam Schubert (born 12 January 1985) is an Australian former professional rugby league footballer who played in the 2000s.

Career
Schubert Made his NRL debut in Round 13 2005, against the Sea Eagles.

He scored his first career try against the Warriors in Round 19.

References

1985 births
Australian rugby league players
Living people
Sydney Roosters players
Rugby league second-rows
Rugby league locks
Place of birth missing (living people)